Northern Samar, officially the Province of Northern Samar, is a province in the Philippines located in the Eastern Visayas region. Its capital is Catarman and is located at the northern portion of the island of Samar. Bordering the province to the south are the provinces of Samar and Eastern Samar. To the northwest, across the San Bernardino Strait is Sorsogon; to the east is the Philippine Sea and to the west is Samar Sea.

History
Historian William Henry Scott wrote that a “Samar datu by the name of Iberein was rowed out to a Spanish vessel anchored in his harbor in 1543 by oarsmen collared in gold; while wearing on his own person earrings and chains.” In the local epic called siday entitled Bingi of Lawan as written in the article of Scott, Lawan is a prosperous Lakanate in Samar. Datu Hadi Iberein came from the Lakanate of Lawan 

In 1614, the Jesuits established a mission residence in Palapag among the Ibabao populace. These missionaries stayed until the late 17th century when they were expelled from the Philippines in 1768 and were replaced by the Franciscans.

As the San Bernardino Strait was along the route of the Spanish galleons plying between Manila and Acapulco, Mexico, a royal port was established in Palapag where the richly laden Manila galleons were protected from unfavorable winds and troubled seas.

In the early years of the 16th century, shipbuilders were drafted from Palapag to the Cavite shipyards for the construction of galleons and vessels for the conservation of defense of the island. It was also at this time that these recruits ignited the Sumoroy insurrection, which signaled a general uprising against Spain in the Visayas and Mindanao. The insurrection simultaneously flared northward to Albay and southward to the northern coasts of Mindanao and then Cebu. It took over a year before the Spaniards were able to subdue the rebellion.

Later in 1898, when the Americans landed on the beach of Catarman, they organized a revolutionary army led by General Vicente Lukban who fought the invaders armed with cannons and rifles with only bolos and paltiks. Although defeated, they, however, continued to harass the Americans through guerrilla warfare.

During World War II, the people of Northern Samar organized a platoon of volunteers supported by voluntary contributions. The contingent became a part of the Philippine National Guard in Manila. The province also helped the government by purchasing a considerable amount of bonds floated to finance the National Commission for Independence, then organized by Manuel L. Quezon after a coalition of the Nacionalista and Democrata parties were formed.

Congressmen Eladio T. Balite (1st Dist. Samar), Fernando R. Veloso (2nd Dist. Samar), and Felipe J. Abrigo (3rd Dist. Samar), authored Republic Act 4221 which was approved by Congress in 1963. The law, ratified in a plebiscite on June 19, 1965, divided Samar into three: Northern Samar, Eastern Samar and (Western) Samar. The first provincial officials of Northern Samar were elected on November 14, 1967, and on January 1, 1968, they officially assumed office.

Geography

Northern Samar covers a total area of  occupying the northern section of Samar Island in the Eastern Visayas region. The province is bounded by north by the San Bernardino Strait, on the east by the Pacific Ocean, on the west by the Samar Sea, on the southwest by Samar and on the southeast by Eastern Samar. It ranks thirty-seventh (37th) in size among the 80 provinces of the Philippines and accounts for practically 1.2 percent of the total land area of the country. About 52 percent of the total land area is covered by forest and 42 percent is classified as alienable and disposable.

The province is composed largely of low and extremely rugged hills and small lowland areas. It also has small and discontinuous areas along the coasts and its rivers are usually accompanied by alluvial plains and valleys. The province is endowed with relatively rich and fertile soil that most crops can grow on it.

Topography
Northern Samar has a very rugged terrain with restricted pocket plains and valleys. River valleys are low-lying and are often interrupted by hills, while the remaining portion is rolling, hilly, and mountainous. The interior of the mainland consists of highly dissected hills and mountain peaks. Low-lying hills are found between the coastal plains of Palapag, the river valley of Gamay, and Catubig Valley.

Climate
Northern Samar falls under the intermediate type climate, which has no distinct dry and wet seasons. The rainiest months are October to January, while the driest is the month of May.

Administrative divisions
Northern Samar is divided into three major geographical areas, namely: Balicuatro area, Central area, and Pacific area including Catubig Valley – the province’s rice granary. It comprises 24 towns or municipalities with 569 registered barangays. The province is divided into two legislative districts, the first district, covering the Balicuatro and most part of the Central Area, and the second district, covering the some part of the Central Area, the Pacific Area and the Catubig Valley.

Demographics

The people of Northern Samar were previously called Ibabaonon or Lequios. They are predominantly Waray-Waray or Waray, the people of Eastern Visayas or Samar-Leyte region. To distinguish themselves from the Westehanon (people from Samar) and Estehanon (from Eastern Samar) when Samar Island was split into three provinces in 1965, and the Leyteños (the people from the Leyte Island), they now call themselves as Ninorte Samarenyo or Nortehanon. They are primarily speaking in Waray-Waray which is the main lingua franca of the province.

Bicolano Inhabitants coming from the neighboring provinces of Sorsogon and Masbate are also common at Northern Samar.

Languages

The majority of the people in the province speak the Ninorte Samarnon variation of Waray-Waray. About 4.5 percent of the population, especially in the island towns, speak Cebuano, particularly in the island town of San Antonio. Inabaknon, a unique language said to be one of the most preserved languages to date, is the native tongue of the populace in the island town of Capul.

Ninorte Samarnon usually is further subclassified into Balicuatro, Central and Pacific speakers.

Tagalog and English are also widely used and understood in Northern Samar.

Religion
The communities of this province are predominantly Catholic (80%). Other religious groups are Members Church of God International (Ang Dating Daan), Iglesia ni Cristo, Philippine Independent Church (Iglesia Filipina Independiente), Seventh-day Adventists, Jehovah’s Witnesses, The Church of Jesus Christ of Latter-day Saints and other Christian sects. A small number of population are Muslim.

Socio-demographic situation
Northern Samar is classified as a second class province, according to the Philippine Statistics Authority, the data gathered from the Department of Finance Department Order No.23-08 (Effective July 29, 2008).

Catarman is the capital town of the province where most political and economic activities take place. It is the seat of administration and the center of trade and commerce as well as industry.

The province is considered a very rural area with 65% of its people residing in the countryside.

Economy

Tourism
Northern Samar has several tourism potentials that remain undiscovered by tourists. Some of these include old churches, waterfalls, rivers, caves, virgin forests, and beaches.

Among the last frontiers in the country, its rugged coastline of limestone cliffs along the Pacific Ocean is a historical landmark. During the Spanish colonial era, Samar island was the first Philippine landfall seen by the Manila galleons as they approached the end of their long voyage from Acapulco.

Entering the waters of the Philippine archipelago, the galleons called at the fortified island of Capul off Samar, offered thanks for a safe crossing at the Jesuit church, and then negotiated the rough waters of the narrow San Bernardino Strait toward Manila, their final destination.

Capul also became the last stop on Philippine soil of the departing galleons before the long, often treacherous trans-Pacific voyage to Acapulco in Mexico.

Government

Governor
 Edwin C. Ongchuan (NUP)

Vice Governor
 Clarence E. Dato (NUP)

Congressional districts
 1st district: Paul R. Daza (NUP)
 2nd district: Harris M. Ongchuan (NUP)

List of former governors

 Irene Balite (1967–1971)
 Edilberto A. del Valle (1971–1980)
 Reynaldo A. del Valle (1980–1986)
 Justiniano M. Singzon (1986–1988)
 Harlin  Abayon (1988–1998)
 Madeleine M. Ong (1998–2001)
 Raul A. Daza (2001–2010)
 Paul R. Daza (2010–2013)
 Jose L. Ong, Jr. (2013–2019)

Official provincial seal

The Coat of Arms of Samar represents the political, geographical description, historical, economic, and social representation and allegorical ideas of the province. The letters N and S represent Northern Samar. The map of Northern Samar represents the geography and 24 municipalities of the province, including the five island towns. The galleon represents the Spanish conquistadors that reached the land of the Ibabao to preach the gospel of Christianity, spread the Creed of Roman Catholicism and introduce civil governance thru the Royal Port of Palapag in 1640. Mount Bubuya (Palapag Mesa) represents the highest mountain range in Palapag, where Agustin Sumuroy and his men retreated to and encamped after killing Fr. Miguel Balberan, thus starting the Sumuroy Rebellion. The rice field, abaca, timber, and coconut are all economic representations.

The following are the allegorical ideas of the province: Blue, the color is symbolic of vast marine and aquatic resources, a source of livelihood for the fisher folks of the coastal towns. Tangerine represents the cheerfulness, high spirits, and optimism of the people of the province. Yellow represents golden harvest, and abundance of resources. White symbolizes transparency in governance. The torch is meant to illuminate the province and set it afire with quality education, a primary thrust of the provincial government. Rope ties the emblems together in a circular shape, it represents equality in rights and justice, and unity for peace and development.

Notable people

 Agustin Sumuroy (better known as Juan Sumuroy), a Filipino hero from Palapag, Northern Samar and Waray leader of the Sumuroy Rebellion, a rebellion of native Filipinos against colonial Spanish forces that occurred in the eastern Visayas in 1649–1650.
 Isko Moreno, mayor of Manila, whose mother is from Allen, Northern Samar
 Samuel Martires, a Filipino lawyer, Associate Justice of Sandiganbayan from 2005 to 2017, Associate Justice of the Supreme Court of the Philippines and incumbent Ombudsman of the Philippines, is from Palapag, Northern Samar.  
 Angel Aquino, Filipino fashion model, TV host, and FAMAS and Gawad Urian Award-nominated film and TV actress
 Errol "Budoy" Marabiles, Filipino reggae musician, songwriter and TV host; vocalist of the reggae band Junior Kilat
 Pooh, Filipino actor, comedian, impersonator, singer, and TV host.
 Aloy Adlawan, multi-awarded Filipino filmmaker, writer, producer, director, and composer

References

External links

 
 Official Webpage of the Office of the Secretary to the Sangguniang Panlalawigan of the Province of Northern Samar
 Philippine Standard Geographic Code
 Local Governance Performance Management System

 
1965 establishments in the Philippines
Provinces of the Philippines
Provinces of Eastern Visayas
States and territories established in 1965
Samar